{{Speciesbox
| name = Hyloscirtus bogotensis
| image = 
| status = NT 
| status_system = IUCN3.1
| taxon = Hyloscirtus bogotensis
| authority = (Peters, 1882)
| synonyms =*Hyloscirtus vermiculatus B. Lutz & Ruíz-Carranza, 1977Hyloscirtus bogotensis Peters, 1882,Hylonomus bogotensis Peters, 1882Hyla bogotensis Duellman, 1970Hyloscirtus vermiculatus Lutz and Ruiz-Carranza, 1977Hyloscirtus bogotensis Faivovich, Haddad, Garcia, Frost, Campbell, and Wheeler, 2005Boana bogotensis Wiens, Fetzner, Parkinson, and Reeder, 2005
|status_ref=
}}Hyloscirtus bogotensis'', called Bogota tree frog in English, is a species of frog in the family Hylidae endemic to Colombia. It has been observed between 1750 and 3600 meters above sea level.

Its natural habitats are subtropical or tropical moist montane forests, subtropical or tropical high-altitude shrubland, subtropical or tropical high-altitude grassland, and rivers.

It is threatened by habitat loss.

Sources

Hyloscirtus
Amphibians of Colombia
Amphibians of the Andes
Amphibians described in 1882
Taxa named by Wilhelm Peters
Taxonomy articles created by Polbot